The 2021–22 Korisliiga season was the 82nd season of the top professional basketball league in Finland.

Format 
The twelve teams played two times against each one of the other teams for a total of 22 games. The league splits into two groups (one with the first 6 teams and the other with the last 6 teams) and each team played two games against each one of the teams from the same group (for a total of 10 games). The six teams from the first group and the best two teams from the second group joined the playoffs. The last team would be directly relegated.

Teams 
Ura Basket did not apply for a serial licence for the Men's Korisliiga for season 2021-2022. Ura Basket will be the Division I B team, where the club's own breeders will be able to represent Kaarina basketball at the national level. In the 2020–2021 season, LoKoKo Bisons was able to celebrate the Men's Division A championship. The Bisons climbed back to the Premier Korisliiga to season 2021-2022.

Regular season

League table

Results

Placement round

League table

Results

Qualifying round

League table

Results

Playoffs
The quarter-finals and semi-finals were played in a best-of-three 1–1–1–1–1 format. The finals were played in a best-of-seven playoff format.

Bracket

Finnish clubs in European competitions

References

Korisliiga seasons
Finnish